Nidhi is a treasure in Hindu mythology. Nidhi may also refer to

Nidhi (given name)
Nidhi (surname)
Vidya Nidhi, Sri Lankan national honour awarded for scientific and technological achievements
 Nidhi company, a non-bank financial institution in India